The Ministry of Defence and Veteran Affairs (MODVA) is the government department responsible for the administration of military affairs and veterans affairs in Namibia. It was established as Ministry of Defence (MOD) at Namibian independence in 1990. In 2020 the portfolio of veteran affairs was added to defence after the Ministry of Veteran Affairs had been dissolved in 2015. The first Namibian defence minister was Peter Mweshihange, the  Minister of Defence and Veteran Affairs is Frans Kapofi.

The political leader of MODVA is the minister while the accounting officer is the executive director (ED), deputised by a deputy executive director. The deputy ED heads the Department of Defence secretariat and administration. This department is made up of six directorates: Education and Civil Training, Construction and Maintenance, Finance, Defence Central Staff, Procurement Research and Development, and Defence Legal Advisor. All the directorates are headed by civilian directors. In exceptional cases, commissioned officers with the rank of Brigadier general can be appointed as directors in the department.

Ministers of Defence
Peter Mweshihange (1990–1995)
Philemon Malima (1995–1997)
Colonel (ret) Erkki Nghimtina (1997–2005) 
Major General (ret) Charles Namoloh (2005–2012)
Nahas Angula (2012–2015)
Penda Ya Ndakolo (2015–2020)
Rear Admiral (ret) Peter Vilho (2020-2021)
Frans Kapofi (2021-current)

References

Military of Namibia
 
Government of Namibia
1990 establishments in Namibia